Dmitriyevka is a rural locality (a village) in Shingak-Kulsky Selsoviet, Chishminsky District, Bashkortostan, Russia. The population was 312 as of 2010.

Geography 
It is located 22 km from Chishmy.

References 

Rural localities in Chishminsky District